Sir Haydn is a narrow gauge steam locomotive, built by Hughes's Locomotive & Tramway Engine Works of the Falcon Works, Loughborough in 1878. It operated on the Corris Railway in Wales, until closure in 1948, and since 1951 has operated on the nearby Talyllyn Railway. It has carried the operating number 3 under four successive owners.

History

Corris Railway
The Corris Railway was a  gauge tramway built in 1859, which ran from Machynlleth north to Corris and on to Aberllefenni to serve local slate quarries. Originally, the line was horse-drawn, but three identical  locomotives, numbered 1 to 3, were ordered from Hughes' in 1878.

In December 1885, the Talyllyn Railway wrote to the board of the Corris Railway asking to buy one of the Hughes locomotives. Although the sale did not take place, it was a precursor to the post-preservation purchase of No. 3 by the Talyllyn more than 60 year later.

Rebuild 
In 1921, the Corris acquired a fourth locomotive from Kerr Stuart and No.2 became a standby. No. 1 had received a new boiler in 1913, which had seen little use, and in 1922 the railway began the process of creating one working locomotive from components of the other two Hughes locos. Evidence suggests that the resulting locomotive had: frames made up of plates from Nos. 1 and 3; the boiler and saddle tank of No. 1; the cab and bunker of No. 3; and possibly motion parts from No. 2. In all, it is most accurate to say No. 1 was rebuilt using parts from the other locomotives, but the resulting engine carried number 3, including its works plates. No.2 remained largely intact at Machynlleth station until 1928. At the end of the 1920s negotiations began to sell the Corris Railway to the Great Western Railway and a report dated 12 October 1929 stated that locos 1 and 2 had been "marked off for some time as scrap"; they were handed over to a local scrap merchant and excluded from the assets taken on when the purchase was completed on 4 August 1930.

Great Western years 
In the Great Western period the line was largely dependent on the slate output of Aberllefenni Quarry, which from 6 April 1935 was leased by the local member of parliament and owner of the Talyllyn Railway, Sir Henry Haydn Jones. His support for rail transport for the quarry's output was critical in keeping the railway open up to and including World War Two; without this support it is likely that the railway would have closed and the locomotives been scrapped. No. 3 was still working when the Corris came under the control of British Railways following nationalisation in 1948, but operation under this organisation proved short-lived as the last train ran on 20 August that year.
It then was left under tarpaulin at the rear of the Corris Railway's Machynlleth Station along with the other remaining Corris engine, No. 4.

Talyllyn Railway

The Talyllyn Railway was built in 1865 and ran from Towyn (now spelt Tywyn) to the slate quarries of Bryn Eglwys, only a few miles from Corris. It was built to the same gauge as the Corris Railway, but unlike that line used steam traction from the start. The line and quarries were bought by Sir Henry Haydn Jones in 1911. The venture made little money, but despite the closure of the quarries in 1946, Haydn Jones continued to operate the railway at a loss until his death in 1950.

That same year, a group of enthusiasts, including the author Tom Rolt, had looked at the possibility of operating the railway on a volunteer basis. With the agreement of Haydn Jones' widow a deal was made, and control of the railway passed to the newly formed preservation society. One of the major problems facing the railway was the lack of motive power; the railway owned two locomotives, the first of which, Talyllyn, had been out of service for some years, and the second, Dolgoch, was in need of a major overhaul. The society therefore approached British Railways to attempt to purchase the two remaining Corris locos, and successfully negotiated to purchase them at £25 each (equivalent to £ in present-day terms).

No. 3 had been unnamed on the Corris, but received the name Sir Haydn upon arrival on the Talyllyn Railway, after the former owner of the railway; it seems that at that time it was not appreciated the crucial role Haydn Jones had played in keeping the Corris line running in the 1930s, which had played an important part in ensuring the locomotive's survival. Along with No. 4, it kept its Corris number, giving both locos the unusual distinction of carrying the same number through the ownership of four different railway companies (the Corris, Great Western, British Railways and Talyllyn Railway). Because both railways were built to the unusual gauge of  it was relatively easy to adapt the Corris locomotives to work on the Talyllyn Railway. Sir Haydn became the first new locomotive to travel on the railway for over 85 years. Upon arriving Sir Haydn was the engine in better condition but frequently derailed however and could not be used safely. Upon inspection it turned out that the Talyllyn track was laid approximately  wider than the official gauge, a deliberate policy by the old company to accommodate the long wheelbase of Talyllyn. The two original Talyllyn locomotives had unusually wide wheel treads that allowed them to stay on the wide-of-gauge track. This problem was eventually cured by the fitting of wider wheel treads and by a Territorial Army members' exercise in 1953 relaying the railway to its correct gauge making Sir Haydn usable. The original cab, which only had an opening on the right-hand side, was replaced in the 1960s.

Return visits to Corris 
The Corris Railway was reopened to passengers in 2002, and No. 3 returned there in June 2003 for a month of running trains to celebrate the railway's rebirth. It returned again at the end of April 2012 to run a series of special trains before the expiry of its boiler certificate in May, and remained at Corris until 24 April 2013. Afterwards No. 3 commenced a tour of various railway sites in England to help raise funds for an overhaul, which was undertaken at the Vale of Rheidol Railway workshops, in Aberystwyth, before returning to service on the Talyllyn in June 2018.

Alan Keef is constructing a new locomotive based on the design of No. 3 for the Corris Railway. The first steaming took place on 24 September 2022  and it is hoped that the loco will be delivered to Corris in 2023.

In fiction

Sir Haydn is the basis for the character Sir Handel from The Railway Series by the Rev. W. Awdry and Thomas & Friends running on the fictional Skarloey Railway and formerly on the Mid Sodor Railway.

In the 1980s, the Talyllyn Railway repainted Sir Haydn to represent Sir Handel. Christopher Awdry wrote this into the 1985 book Great Little Engines, explaining that Sir Handel was visiting the line to help out. An incident in which Sir Haydn ran into a tree branch and was given a bandage and eyepatch was turned into a story in the book, with almost no alteration from the real event.

References

Bibliography

External links

 Sir Haydn page on Talyllyn Railway website

Corris Railway
Talyllyn Railway locomotives
Individual locomotives of Great Britain
Preserved narrow gauge steam locomotives of Great Britain
0-4-2ST locomotives
Railway locomotives introduced in 1878
Brush Traction locomotives